Gasco Building may refer to:

 Failing Office Building, Portland, Oregon
 Portland Gas & Coke Building, Portland, Oregon